Gentilly Nuclear Generating Station (Centrale nucléaire de Gentilly in French) is a former nuclear power station located on the south shore of the St. Lawrence River in Bécancour, Quebec, 100 km north east of Montreal. The site contained two nuclear reactors;  Gentilly-1, a 250 MW CANDU-BWR prototype, was marred by technical problems and shut down in 1977, and Gentilly-2, a 675-MW CANDU-6 reactor operated commercially by the government-owned public utility Hydro-Québec between 1983 and 2012. These were the only power generating nuclear reactors in Quebec.

The Gentilly reactors were constructed in stages between 1966 and 1983 and were originally part of a plan for 30-35 nuclear reactors in Quebec. A third reactor, Gentilly-3, was scheduled to be built on the same site but was cancelled because of a drop in demand growth in the late 1970s.

In October 2012, it was decided for economic reasons not to proceed with the refurbishment of Gentilly-2, and to decommission the power plant instead. The process will take approximately 50 years to complete. In December of that same year, the remaining reactor was shut down and the decommissioning process started.

Gentilly-1
Gentilly-1 was a prototype CANDU-BWR reactor, based on the SGHWR design.  It was designed for a net output of 250MW(e).  The reactor had several features unique amongst CANDU reactors, including vertically oriented pressure tubes (allowing for the use of a single fuelling machine below the core), and light-water coolant.  These features were intended to reduce the cost and complexity of the unit, again to make it an attractive export unit.  However, the design was not successful, and over 7 years recorded only 180 on-power days.  Gentilly-1 is no longer in operation.

Gentilly-2
Gentilly-2 is a standard CANDU 6 reactor, similar to the Point Lepreau Nuclear Generating Station. The plant has a net output of 675MW(e). Unlike the adjacent Gentilly-1 reactor, Gentilly-2 has had a good service record since start-up in 1982, with a cumulative operating factor of 76.4%.

In an August 19, 2008 announcement, Québec planned to spend $1.9B to overhaul Gentilly-2 in order to extend its lifespan to 2040. Refurbishment of the reactor was eventually cancelled when on 3 October 2012, Hydro-Quebec's CEO, Thierry Vandal, announced the decommissioning of the Gentilly-2 generating station for economic reasons, scheduled to occur on 28 December 2012 at 10:30 p.m. At that time, a decommissioning process will proceed over a period of 50 years and is expected to cost $1.8 billion. The permanent shut down and decommissioning of the power plant followed an election pledge from Quebec premier, Pauline Marois.

The Gentilly site also houses a 411MW gas turbine generation plant. The Bécancour generating station was commissioned in 1992-1993.

Gentilly-3
Gentilly-3 was a proposed nuclear reactor at the Gentilly site. It was cancelled by Quebec Premier René Lévesque. A white book study published by the Parti Québécois (PQ) before ascending to power found that Gentilly-3 was not needed for Quebec's future energy needs and that it could be fulfilled with hydroelectricity. After the election of the PQ government, a moratorium on construction of nuclear plants was put into place. The reactor had been scheduled to be completed before 1990, and was the last reactor firmly committed to by Hydro-Québec and the Province of Quebec, though Quebec had committed to buy enough heavy water for four Candu style reactors, processed by the La Prade heavy water plant (near Trois-Rivières), scheduled for 1982 opening.

See also

 Economy of Quebec
 List of electrical generating stations in Quebec
 List of power stations in Canada

References
Notes

References

External links
Hydro-Québec Gentilly-2 page

Nuclear power stations in Quebec
Hydro-Québec
Nuclear power stations using CANDU reactors
Buildings and structures in Centre-du-Québec
Former power stations in Canada